A Just Punishment is a lost 1914 silent short film directed by Edward Le Saint and starring Guy Oliver and Eugenie Besserer.

Cast
Guy Oliver - Bob Preston
Eugenie Besserer - Mrs. Preston
Lillian Wade - Adele, the Preston Child
Jack McDonald - Preston, the Rich Uncle

References

External links
 A Just Punishment at IMDb.com
 lobby poster

1914 films
American silent short films
Films directed by Edward LeSaint
Lost American films
Selig Polyscope Company films
American black-and-white films
1914 drama films
1910s American films